One for the Road is a 2014 Mexican road comedy-drama film directed by Jack Zagha Kababie. It was one of fourteen films shortlisted by Mexico to be their submission for the Academy Award for Best Foreign Language Film at the 88th Academy Awards, but it lost out to 600 Miles.

Cast
 Luis Bayardo as Agustín
 Eduardo Manzano as Benito
 José Carlos Ruiz as Emiliano

References

External links
 

2014 films
2014 comedy-drama films
Mexican comedy-drama films
2010s Spanish-language films
2010s Mexican films

2010s road comedy-drama films
Films about old age